The Mangaheia River is a river of the Gisborne Region of New Zealand's North Island. It flows southeast from its origins in rough hill country inland from Tolaga Bay, joining with the Ūawa River close to its outflow into Tolaga Bay. The river catchment is predominately managed forestry land northwest of Tolaga Bay and there have been significant issues with forestry slash during periods of flood.

See also
List of rivers of New Zealand

References 

Rivers of the Gisborne District
Rivers of New Zealand